Ya veremos is a 2018 Mexican comedy drama film directed by Pedro Pablo Ibarra, and written by Alberto Bremer. The film stars Mauricio Ochmann, Fernanda Castillo, and Emiliano Aramayo. The film was released nationally in Mexico by Videocine on 2 August 2018, and debuted at the top of the box office, reaching a first four-day weekend gross of 73 million Mexican Pesos, the second-best all-time opening weekend for a Mexican film after Instructions Not Included.

Distributed by Pantelion Films, it was released in the United States on 31 August 2018. It was panned by critics, but was a moderate success.

Plot 
Santi (Emiliano Aramayo) is a child who has had to deal with the separation of his parents, Rodrigo (Mauricio Ochmann) and Alejandra (Fernanda Castillo). They are required to meet once in a while, as they share their child's time. One day they receive the news that Santi must undergo surgery so as not to lose his sight, so Santi makes a wish list and asks to fulfill it together with his two parents, before the operation. Rodrigo and Alejandra must learn to coexist again, embarking (without suspecting it) on a trip that, in the end, will make it very difficult to separate again.

Cast 
 Mauricio Ochmann as Rodrigo
 Fernanda Castillo as Alejandra
 Emiliano Aramayo as Santi
 Estefania Ahumada as Irma
 Erik Hayser
 Jorge Caballero
 Camila Ibarra

Reception

Box office
, Ya Veremos has grossed $2.2 million in the United States and Canada, and $10 million in other territories, for a total worldwide gross of $12.2 million.

The film was released in Mexico on 2 August 2018, and finished at the top of the box office, reaching a first four-day weekend gross of 73 million Mexican Pesos ($3.3 million), the second-best all-time opening weekend for a Mexican film after Instructions Not Included.

In its opening weekend in the US the film made $1.8 million in its opening weekend (including $2.2 million over the four-day Labor Day weekend) from 369 theaters.

Critical response
The film received lukewarm reception by critics. On Metacritic, the film has a weighted average score of 25 out of 100, based on 4 critics, indicating "generally unfavorable reviews".

Writing for The Hollywood Reporter, Frank Scheck criticized the "juvenile humor and ersatz emotion" and wrote, "The film might have proved tolerable, barely, if the two adult leads had any spark of chemistry, but such is not the case. Ochmann attempts to bring boyish charm to his performance but merely comes across as immature, while Castillo goes overboard in the other direction with her stiffness. We never come to care whether their characters get back together, which is the kiss of death in a romantic comedy."

References 

2018 films
Mexican comedy-drama films